Caroling, Caroling: Christmas with Natalie Cole is an album by Natalie Cole that was released by Elektra in 2008. It is a compilation of tracks from her previous holiday albums.

Track listing

Charts

References

2008 Christmas albums
Christmas albums by American artists
Elektra Records albums
Natalie Cole albums